The following is a list of seasons played by Fortuna Düsseldorf from the 1947–48 season up to the most recent season. It is divided into two parts coinciding with the regional league structure of post-war Germany, and the formation of a nationwide league, the Bundesliga.

Key

 Avg. Att. = Average attendance at home
 Europe = European competition entered
 Result = Result in that competition

 — = Did not Qualify
 R1 = Round 1
 R2 = Round 2
 R3 = Round 3
 R4 = Round 4

 Group = Group stage
 QF = Quarter-finals
 SF = Semi-finals
 RU = Runners-Up
 W = Winners

1947 to 1963: Oberliga West

1963 to Present: Formation of the Bundesliga 
Since 1963 Fortuna Düsseldorf have played in the top four tiers of the German football league system. Fortuna Düsseldorf's most successful period during these years was from the 1971–72 season until the 1986–87 season. They played 16 consecutive seasons in the Bundesliga, twice won the DFB-Pokal and reached the final of the Cup Winners' Cup in 1980.

References

External links 

 

Fortuna Düsseldorf
Fortuna Düsseldorf
German football club statistics